Patrick Robbins (18 November 1914 – 1986) was an Irish footballer who played as an inside forward and an outside forward. He played for Oldham Athletic, Hartlepools United and Accrington Stanley in the Football League.

Career
Born in Birr, Robbins started his career in the English non-League, playing for Thornaby St Patrick's and Stockton. He earned a Football League move by joining Middlesbrough in September 1933, before moving to Blackburn Rovers in February 1934. He did not make any league appearances for either side, and in May 1935 signed for Oldham Athletic. After making 85 league appearances and scoring 15 goals in the league for Oldham in three seasons, Robbins signed for Hartlepools United in June 1938. He spent the 1938–39 season with Hartlepools, making 29 appearances and scoring 5 goals before joining Accrington Stanley in July 1939. Robbins scored two goals in three league appearances before the 1939–40 season was suspended with the outbreak of the Second World War. After competitive football resumed, Robbins signed for York City in January 1945, and played in their eight FA Cup matches in the 1945–46 season.

References

1914 births
1986 deaths
People from Birr, County Offaly
Irish association footballers (before 1923)
Association football forwards
Stockton F.C. players
Middlesbrough F.C. players
Blackburn Rovers F.C. players
Oldham Athletic A.F.C. players
Hartlepool United F.C. players
Accrington Stanley F.C. (1891) players
York City F.C. players
English Football League players